The Lincoln Lawyer is an American legal drama streaming television series created for television by David E. Kelley and developed by Ted Humphrey, based on the 2008 novel The Brass Verdict by Michael Connelly, a sequel to his novel The Lincoln Lawyer. It stars Manuel Garcia-Rulfo as Mickey Haller, a defense attorney in Los Angeles who works out of a chauffeur-driven Lincoln Navigator rather than an office. Neve Campbell, Becki Newton, Jazz Raycole, Angus Sampson, and Christopher Gorham also star.

It premiered on Netflix on May 13, 2022. It received generally positive reviews from critics. In June 2022, the series was renewed for a second season which has been reported to be based upon Connelly's 2011 novel, The Fifth Witness (the fourth book in The Lincoln Lawyer series of books); it is expected to be available to stream in 2023.

Premise
Lawyer Mickey Haller works in the back of his Lincoln Navigator as he takes on cases in Los Angeles.

Cast

Main

 Manuel Garcia-Rulfo as Mickey Haller, a criminal-defense lawyer and recovering addict.
 Neve Campbell as Maggie McPherson (main: season 1; recurring: season 2), Mickey's first wife and a criminal prosecutor.
 Becki Newton as Lorna Crane, Mickey's second ex-wife and his legal aide.
 Jazz Raycole as Izzy Letts, a former addict and client of Mickey, now working as his personal driver
 Angus Sampson as Cisco, Mickey's friend and go-to investigator and Lorna's fiancé. With Cisco, Griggs adapts the role of Mickey's half-brother Harry Bosch from The Brass Verdict (a character not included in the series by name due to rights issues with Amazon Studios).
 Christopher Gorham as Trevor Elliott (season 1), a billionaire video game developer suspected of a double murder.

Recurring
 Ntare Guma Mbaho Mwine as Detective Raymond Griggs, a detective investigating Jerry Vincent’s murder case. With Cisco, Griggs adapts the role of Harry Bosch from The Brass Verdict (a character not included in the series by name due to rights issues with Amazon Studios), and is considered an adaptation of the character.
 LisaGay Hamilton as Judge Mary Holder, the Chief Judge of the Los Angeles Superior Court
 Jamie McShane as Detective Lee Lankford, a detective investigating Angelo Soto with Maggie
 Reggie Lee as Angelo Soto, a business owner suspected of utilizing slave labor; currently being prosecuted by Maggie
 Carlos Bernard as Robert Cardone, a District Attorney running for re-election
 Kim Hawthorne as Janelle Simmons, also running for District Attorney
 Michael Graziadei as Jeff Golantz, Deputy District Attorney and prosecutor in the Trevor Elliot trial
 Krista Warner as Hayley Haller, Mickey and Maggie's daughter
 Lamont Thompson as Judge James P. Stanton, the judge presiding over the Trevor Elliott trial
 Saul Huezo as Jésus Menendez, an old client of Mickey's, whom Mickey encouraged to plead guilty despite believing he was innocent
 Katrina Rosita as Tanya Cruz, Soto's girlfriend
 Heather Mazur as Carol Dubois, an insurance agent who had an affair with Jan Rilz
 Mikal Vega as Eli Wyms, a former marine and client of Jerry Vincent
 Mike McColl as Glenn McSweeney, Juror Number Seven
 Chris Browning as Teddy Vogel, leader of the Road Saints Motorcycle Club
 Matt Angel as Henry Dahl (season 2), a true crime podcaster covering Trammell's case
 Yaya DaCosta as Andrea "Andy" Freeman (season 2), a formidable criminal prosecutor in Trammell's case
 Lana Parrilla as Lisa Trammell (season 2), a chef accused of murdering a real estate developer

Guest
 Christine Horn as Joanne Giorgetti, Deputy District Attorney and prosecutor in Eli Wyms' case, also Hayley's soccer coach
 Jeff Francisco as Alvin Aquino, a parolee affiliated with Angelo Soto
 Paul Rae as Bruce Carlin, Jerry Vincent's investigator
 Paul Urcioli as Jerry Vincent, a defense lawyer whose practice Mickey inherits
 Jordyn Chang as Charlotte Yeoh, Trevor Elliott's receptionist
 Shwayze as Terrell Coleman, a client of Jerry Vincent who Mickey sympathizes with
 Mageina Tovah as Wren Williams, Jerry Vincent's receptionist
 Kadeem Harrison as Detective Kinder, a detective investigating the murders of Trevor's wife and her lover
 Katy Erin as Lara Elliott, Trevor's wife, who he is accused of murdering
 Johann Urb as Jan Rilz, Lara's yoga instructor, who she had an affair with
 Puja Mohindra as Sonia Patel, a friend and former coworker of Lara
 Jonathan Avigdori as Anton Shavar, a man running a private security firm whose ex-wife also had an affair with Jan Rilz
 Katherine von Drachenberg as herself as a poker player
 Darrell Dennis as Detective Kyle Winters, the detective in Jesus Menendez' case, former protege of Detective Lee Lankford
 Ramona DuBarry as Detective Linda Perez, an associate of Lankford and Winters who formerly worked vice
 Amelia Brantley as Cherry, a prostitute and associate of Gloria Dayton who also works as an informant for Mickey
 Anthony A. Kung as David Loresca, an informant for Maggie in her case against Soto
 Elliott Gould as David "Legal" Siegel, a family friend of Mickey and his father
 Brion Bronson as young David "Legal" Siegel
 Andrea Savo as Elena, Mickey's mother, an actress
 Adan James Carillo as young Mickey Haller
 Chris Gehrt as Michael Connelly, a reporter who wrote stories of Mickey's father. Connelly is the writer of the books upon which the series is based, and formerly worked as a crime reporter before becoming a full-time writer.
 Jon Tenney as Mickey Haller Sr, Mickey's father
 Fiona Rene as Gloria Dayton, a prostitute and the key witness for Jesus Menendez' case
 Christopher Thornton as Sam Scales, a fraudster and client of Jerry Vincent
 Anna Khaja as Dr. Miriam Arslanian, a forensic expert and witness in the Trevor Elliott trial
 John Cothran as Judge Wallace Canter, the judge presiding over Izzy Letts' case
 Meera Rohit Kumbhani as Sarah Shepard, a deputy district attorney prosecuting Izzy Letts
 Turhan Troy Caylak as Robert Holt, a witness against Izzy Letts
 Bernie Kopell as Marvin Beedleman, a jeweller who is friendly with Mickey
 Justene Alpert as Krisha Gold, a coworker of Jan Rilz
 Julie Ariola as Judge Winifred Champagne, the judge presiding over Terrell Coleman's case
 Eugene Kim as Ernest Choi, a deputy district attorney prosecuting Terrell Coleman
 Marlene Forte as Judge Teresa Medina, the judge presiding over Eli Wyms' case
 Paloma Esparza Rabinov as Kymberly Wagstaff, a repeat client of Mickey
 Megan McNulty as Gina Russo, a deputy district attorney prosecuting Kym Wagstaff
 Paul McKinney as Tony Walsh, a defense attorney friendly with Mickey
 Christopher Amitrano as Dennis Byrne, a mechanic for the Los Angeles Sheriff's Department
 Melvin Diggs as Deputy Murray, a sheriff's deputy who initially investigated Lara and Jan's murders
 Andy Fong as Judge Frank Oh, the judge presiding over assigning bail to Angelo Soto
 Gabriel Burrafato as Mike Pomerantz, Angelo Soto's lawyer
 Michael Cory Davis as Ernie Quienero, a deputy district attorney prosecuting Sam Scales
 Melanie Benz as Neema Shavar, Anton Shavar's ex-wife
 Chau Long as Ryan Lee, a former classmate of Lorna from law school
 Chuck McCollum as Phillip, an employee of the restaurant owned by Judge Stanton's husband
 Makeli Leonard as Misha, a player on Hayley's soccer team
 Alex Lewis as Eric Loomis, a forensic technician for the LAPD
 Jeremiah Caleb as Raj Chowdhury, a client of Gloria Dayton
 Rudy Martinez as Julio Muniz, a videographer who recorded the arrests of Trevor Elliott and Eli Wyms
 Gregory Gast as David Shapiro, Anton Shavar's lawyer
 Bruce Davison as Judge Walter Abrams, the judge presiding over Jesus Menendez' case
 Emerson Brooks as Ben Miller, a deputy district attorney prosecuting Jesus Menendez
 Matt Kirkwood as Dan Daly, Linda Perez' lawyer. Daly is actually a real-life lawyer who went to college with Michael Connelly
 Harry Zinn as Judge Christopher Eagan, the judge presiding over Angelo Soto's case
 Carolyn Ratteray as Sarah Walker, an assistant United States attorney friendly with Maggie McPherson

Episodes

Production

Development
In 2018, David E. Kelley wrote a spec script for a television series set up at Epix by A+E Studios. When the script failed to move forward, he decided to work on a different project with A+E, ultimately adapting The Lincoln Lawyer after sharing his interests in working on legal dramas. In June 2019, the project was given a series production commitment by CBS. In February 2020, Ted Humphrey came aboard as showrunner and Kiele Sanchez joined the cast as Lorna, with Angus Sampson and Jazz Raycole joining a few weeks later as Cisco and Izzy, respectively. In May 2020, it was reported that the series would not be going forward at CBS due to the COVID-19 pandemic in the United States.

At the time of the decision, which CBS Entertainment President Kelly Kahl called a "tough call," two scripts for the series had been written, with two more in development, and Logan Marshall-Green had been in negotiations to star as main character Mickey Haller. On January 11, 2021, Netflix picked up the series with a 10-episode order, down from the original 13-episode plan, and announced that Manuel Garcia-Rulfo would star as Haller. In February 2021, Neve Campbell and Becki Newton joined the cast, with Raycole and Sampson returning to the series. Christopher Gorham was cast in March. In April, Ntare Guma Mbaho Mwine was cast in a role created specifically for the series, with LisaGay Hamilton, Jamie McShane, and Reggie Lee joining the cast in recurring roles. Krista Warner was cast in May.

On June 14, 2022, Netflix renewed the series for a second season, which will be based on The Fifth Witness.

Filming
The Lincoln Lawyer began filming in Los Angeles on March 30, 2021. That same day, author Michael Connelly revealed on social media that the COVID-19 pandemic had previously delayed principal photography for around a year. On June 8, 2021, Connelly said in an interview that six out of the ten episodes had been filmed, of which three of them had been edited completely, while also confirming that characters in the Amazon Prime Video series Bosch, including Haller's half-brother Harry Bosch (portrayed by Titus Welliver), would not be making appearances as both shows are from different networks. Filming concluded on August 3, 2021. Notable filming locations included Admiralty Way in Marina del Rey, Spring Street in Downtown Los Angeles, Grand Avenue, the Wilshire Ebell Theatre, and Wilshire Boulevard.

Filming on season 2 is due to begin on October 31, 2022 and run through to March 2023.

Lawsuit
In August 2021, A+E Studios subsidiary Frankl & Bob Films II, LLC filed a lawsuit against ViacomCBS for "millions of dollars" in losses after it decided to not move forward with the series the previous year. Citing the company's creation on December 4, 2019, the documents state that "after the merger, ViacomCBS's new leadership, led by [George Cheeks] had second-guessed CBS Network's decision to enter into the 13-episode series commitment," and that after finding it "was not valuable to ViacomCBS ... Mr. Cheeks and his fellow ViacomCBS executives decided that it would be better for ViacomCBS as a whole if CBS Network breached that commitment." The documents also claim that ViacomCBS rejected the series because the first episode had not been filmed and said "that breach ensured that the series would never make it onto broadcast television."

Release 
The first season premiered on Netflix on May 13, 2022.

Reception

Audience viewership
By its first three days of release, the series finished #2 on Netflix's weekly ratings. In its first full week of streaming, it was the platform's most-watched English-language series globally, with over 108 million viewing hours, more than three times the second-place show. Between May 8 and June 5, 2022 the series was watched 260.53 million hours globally.

Critical response
 Metacritic, which uses a weighted average, assigned a score of 62 out of 100 based on 16 critics, indicating "generally favorable reviews".

See also 
 The Lincoln Lawyer (film), a 2011 film about the same character

References

External links
 
 

2020s American legal television series
2020s American workplace drama television series
2022 American television series debuts
American legal drama television series
American thriller television series
English-language Netflix original programming 
Television productions postponed due to the COVID-19 pandemic
Television series created by David E. Kelley
Television shows about crime
Television shows based on American novels
Television shows filmed in Los Angeles
Television shows set in Los Angeles
Television series about prosecutors